"Those Were the Days" (produced by Lukasz "Dr. Luke" Gottwald) is the seventh single from UK hip-hop artist Lady Sovereign, and the fifth from her debut album, Public Warning. The single was confirmed for release on her official website and was released to UK download services on 9 April, followed by the physical release on 16 April. The music video for "Those Were the Days" has also been released to various websites on 9 April. The song features Ya Kid K on backup vocals.

Track listing
UK CD single
 "Those Were the Days" - 3:49
 "Random" (Live) - 4:05
 "Love Me or Hate Me" (Live) - 4:00
 "Those Were the Days" (Sinden Remix) - 3:44

Chart

References

2006 songs
2007 singles
Lady Sovereign songs
Songs written by Dr. Luke
Songs written by Lady Sovereign
Song recordings produced by Dr. Luke
Def Jam Recordings singles